Although India is a parliamentary democracy, the country's politics has become dynastic or with high level of nepotism, possibly due to the absence of party organizations, independent civil-society associations which mobilize support for a party, or centralized financing of elections. The dynastic phenomenon is present at the national, state, regional, and district level. The Nehru–Gandhi family has produced three Indian prime ministers, and family members have largely led the Congress party since 1978. The ruling Bharatiya Janata Party (BJP) also has several senior dynastic leaders. In addition to the major national parties, other national and regional parties such as Shiromani Akali Dal, Shiv Sena, Samajwadi Party, Rashtriya Janata Dal, Janata Dal Secular, Jharkhand Mukti Morcha, Dravida Munnetra Kazhagam, Kerala Congress, Jammu & Kashmir National Conference, Indian Union Muslim League, AIMIM, and the Nationalist Congress Party are all dominated by families, mostly those of the party founders.

National

Nehru–Gandhi family 

The Nehru–Gandhi family's involvement with the Congress Party began with Motilal Nehru in the 1920s, when India was still part of the British Empire. The family became more influential under his son, Jawaharlal Nehru, who became a prominent figure in India's nationalist movement. After Jawaharlal's death, his daughter Indira Gandhi became his political heir (her surname came from her husband, Feroze Gandhi. The Nehru-Gandhi dynasty has dominated the Congress Party since Indian independence in 1947. The party was defeated in the 2014 elections, however, and high-level defections took place in Maharashtra, Assam, West Bengal, and Jammu and Kashmir. The family still has widespread name recognition.

Motilal Nehru - Freedom fighter, politician and lawyer
Jawaharlal Nehru - Freedom fighter, First Indian Prime Minister, 1947–1964 (son of Motilal)
Vijaya Lakshmi Pandit - Member of Parliament, diplomat (daughter of Motilal)
Kamala Nehru - Congress Party leader (wife of Jawaharlal)
Indira Gandhi - Prime Minister, 1966–1977 and 1980–1984 (daughter of Jawaharlal)
Feroze Gandhi - Freedom fighter, politician, journalist (husband of Indira)
Rajiv Gandhi - Prime minister, 1984–1989 (son of Feroze and Indira)
Sonia Gandhi - Former President of the Congress Party, leading it to victory in two successive Lok Sabha elections (wife of Rajiv)
Rahul Gandhi - Member of Parliament, former Congress Party president (son of Rajiv and Sonia)
Priyanka Gandhi - Congress Party general secretary (daughter of Rajiv and Sonia)
Robert Vadra - Businessman, entrepreneur (husband of Priyanka)
Sanjay Gandhi - Politician (son of Feroze and Indira)
Maneka Gandhi - Cabinet member of Narendra Modi's government (wife of Sanjay Gandhi) 
Varun Gandhi - Former Member of Parliament (son of Sanjay) 
Uma Nehru - Member of Parliament (cousin of Indira)
Arun Nehru - Former minister (nephew of Indira, son of Uma)

Andhra Pradesh

Reddy family 

 Y. S. Rajasekhara Reddy ("YSR")Chief Minister of Andhra Pradesh from 2004 to 2009
 Y. S. Vivekananda ReddyMP and MLA from Andhra Pradesh (brother of YSR) 
 Y. S. VijayammaChairperson of the YSR Congress Party and MLA in Andhra Pradesh from 2011 to 2014 (wife of YSR)
 Y. S. Jaganmohan ReddyChief Minister of Andhra Pradesh since 30 May 2019
 Y. S. SharmilaNational chairperson of the YSR Congress Party

Bihar

Yadav family
Lalu Prasad YadavFormer Chief Minister of Bihar and former Railway Minister of India
Rabri Devi — Former Chief Minister of Bihar (wife)
Tejashwi Yadav — Deputy CM of Bihar and former leader of the opposition (son of Lalu Prasad Yadav & Rabri Devi)
Tej Pratap Yadav — Former Minister of Health and Environment, Government of Bihar (son of Lalu Prasad Yadav & Rabri Devi)
Misa Bharti — Member of Parliament, Rajya Sabha (daughter of Lalu Prasad Yadav & Rabri Devi)

Mishra family
 Lalit Narayan MishraFormer Railway Minister of India
 Vijay Kumar MishraFormer MLA from Jale and former MP, Lok Sabha from Darbhanga (son of Lalit Narayan Mishra)
 Rishi MishraFormer MLA from Jale (son of Vijay Kumar Mishra)
 Jagannath MishraFormer Chief Minister of Bihar and former Cabinet Minister, Government of India (younger brother of Lalit Narayan Mishra)
 Nitish MishraCurrent Rural Development Minister, Government of Bihar (son of Jagannath Mishra)

Sinha family
Sadhu Sharan Singh - Nationalist, congressman and father of Thakur Jugal Kishore Sinha
Thakur Jugal Kishore SinhaFreedom fighter, member of the first Lok Sabha, known as the father of India's cooperative movement
Ram Dulari SinhaFreedom fighter, member of the first Vidhan Sabha, former Union Minister and governor (wife)
 Madhurendra Kumar Singh - Member All India Congress Committee, former Director Central Warehousing Corporation and Bihar State Cooperative Bank. 
 Mrigendra Kumar Singh - son of Dr. Madhurendra Kumar Singh. State Secretary of Bihar Pradesh Congress Committee, former President of Sheohar Loksabha Youth Congress.

Chhattisgarh

Jogi family 

Ajit JogiFormer Chief Minister of Chhattisgarh
Renu JogiFormer MLA from Kota, Chhattisgarh (wife of Ajit Jogi)
Amit JogiFormer MLA from Marwahi, Chhattisgarh (son of Ajit Jogi & Renu Jogi)

Shukla family 
Shyama Charan ShuklaFormer Chief Minister of Madhya Pradesh
Amitesh ShuklaFormer Rural Development Minister, Government of Chhattisgarh (son of Shyama Charan Shukla)
Vidya Charan Shukla Former Cabinet Minister, Government of India (younger brother of Shyama Charan Shukla)

Kashyap family 

 Baliram KashyapFormer MP, Lok Sabha from Bastar
 Dinesh KashyapFormer MP, Lok Sabha from Bastar (son of Baliram Kashyap)

Singh (Raman) family 

 Raman SinghFormer Chief Minister of Chhattisgarh
 Abhishek SinghFormer MP, Lok Sabha from Rajnandgaon (son)

Goa

Alemao family

Churchill AlemaoFourth Chief Minister of Goa, former MP from South Goa, former MLA from Benaulim and Navelim 
Joaquim AlemaoFormer MLA from Benaulim and Cuncolim (brother)
Yuri AlemaoMLA from Cuncolim (son)

Bandodkar family

Dayanand BandodkarFirst Chief Minister of Goa, former MLA from Mandrem and Marcaim
Shashikala KakodkarSecond Chief Minister of Goa, former MLA from Ponda, Bicholim and Maem (daughter)

Dhavalikar family

Sudin DhavalikarMLA from Marcaim
Deepak DhavalikarFormer MLA from Priol (brother)

D'Souza family

Francis D'SouzaFormer MLA from Mapusa
Joshua D'SouzaMLA from Mapusa (son)

Fernandes family

Victoria Fernandes Former MLA from St. Cruz
Rodolfo FernandesMLA from St. Cruz (son)

Gauns family
Gurudas GaunsFormer MLA from Pale
Pratap GaunsFormer MLA from Pale (brother)

Lobo family

Michael LoboMLA from Calangute
Delilah LoboMLA from Siolim (wife)

Monserrate family

Atanasio MonserrateMLA from Panaji, former MLA from Taleigao and St. Cruz
Jennifer MonserrateMLA from Taleigao (wife)

Rane family

Pratapsingh RaneThird Chief Minister of Goa, former MLA from Sattari and Poriem
Vishwajit Pratapsingh RaneMLA from Valpoi (son)
Deviya Vishwajit RaneMLA from Poriem (wife)

Saldanha family

José Matanhy de SaldanhaFormer MLA from Cortalim
Alina Saldanha Former MLA from Cortalim (wife)

Sequeira family

Jack de SequeiraFirst opposition leader from Goa, former MLA from Panaji and St. Cruz
Erasmo de SequeiraFormer MP from South Goa (son)

Shet family

Anant ShetFormer MLA from Maem
Premendra ShetMLA from Maem (brother)

Vaz family

John Manuel VazFormer MLA from Mormugao
Giovanni Karl VazFormer MLA from Mormugao (son)

Zantye family

Harish Narayan Prabhu ZantyeFormer MP from North Goa, former MLA from Bicholim and Maem
Pravin Zantye Former MLA from Maem (son)

Gujarat

Patel family 
Chimanbhai Patel Family
 Chimanbhai Patel, Former Chief Minister of Gujarat.
 Siddharth Patel, Former Member of Legislative Assembly, Former President of Gujarat Pradesh Congress Committee.
Keshubhai Patel Family
 Keshubhai Patel, Former Chief Minister of Gujarat.
 Bharat Patel, BJP member.
The Patel Family Of Ikhar
Juned Patel, Indian Politician

Haryana

Chautala family

Chaudhari Devi Lal (1915–2001) – Deputy Prime Minister of India (1989–91), Chief Minister of Haryana (1977–79 and 1987–1989)
Om Prakash Chautala – Former Chief Minister of Haryana (son)
Ranjit Singh Chautala – Former MLA and Minister of Haryana (son)
Abhay Chautala – MLA in Haryana and former MLA in Rajasthan (son of Om)
Ajay Chautala – MLA, Former MP from Haryana (son of Om)
Naina Chautala – MLA in Haryana (wife of Ajay)
Dushyant Chautala – Current Deputy Chief Minister, former Member of Parliament from Haryana (son of Ajay)

Jindal family 

Om Prakash Jindal (1930–2005) – Minister of Power of Haryana (2005), Lok Sabha member (1996–1997), member of Haryana Legislative Assembly (1991–1996, 2005)
Savitri Jindal (1950–) – Member of Haryana Legislative Assembly (2005–), Minister of Power of Haryana 2005–2010 (wife)
Naveen Jindal (1970–) – Lok Sabha member 2004–present (son)

Himachal Pradesh

Singh (Virbhadra) family 
Virbhadra Singh (23 June 1934 – 8 July 2021), popularly known as Raja Saheb, was Chief Minister of Himachal Pradesh, member of the Himachal Pradesh Legislative Assembly, and a Union Minister in Manmohan Singh and Indira Gandhi's governments. He was a Lok Sabha member from Mandi and Shimla.
Pratibha Singh (born 16 July 1956) –  Congress Lok Sabha MP from Mandi (wife) 
Vikramaditya Singh (born 17 October 1989)Congress member of the Himachal Pradesh Legislative Assembly (son)

Dhumal family
Prem Kumar Dhumal (born 10 April 1944)Chief Minister of Himachal Pradesh (March 1998March 2003 and 1 January 200825 December 2012), former Lok Sabha member from Hamirpur
Anurag Singh Thakur (born 24 October 1974)Lok Sabha member from Hamirpur, Minister of State for Finance and Corporate Affairs in Narendra Modi's government (son)

Sukh Ram family
Sukh Ram (b. 27 July 1927)Minister of Communications and Information Technology from 1993 to 1996 in the P. V. Narasimha Rao government, Lok Sabha member from Mandi and an MLA
Anil Sharma (b. 30 June 1956)Congress MLA from Mandi in 1993, 2007 and 2012, and a Bharatiya Janata Party MLA in 2017; rejoined the Indian National Congress in 2019 (son)

Jammu and Kashmir

Abdullah family 

 Sheikh AbdullahFormer Chief Minister of Jammu and Kashmir
 Begum Akbar Jehan AbdullahFormer Member of Parliament, Lok Sabha (wife of Sheikh Abdullah)
 Sheikh Mustafa KamalFormer Member of the Jammu and Kashmir Legislative Assembly (son of Sheikh Abdullah & Begum Akbar Jehan Abdullah)
 Farooq AbdullxahFormer Chief Minister of Jammu and Kashmir (son of Sheikh Abdullah & Begum Akbar Jehan Abdullah)
 Omar AbdullahFormer Chief Minister of Jammu and Kashmir and former Minister of State for External Affairs (son of Farooq Abdullah)
 Sachin PilotFormer Deputy Chief Minister of Rajasthan and former Member of Parliament and former Union Minister, Government of India (son-in-law of Farooq Abdullah)

Sayeed family 

Mufti Mohammad SayeedFormer Chief Minister of Jammu and Kashmir and former Minister of Home Affairs
Mehbooba MuftiFormer Chief Minister of Jammu and Kashmir (daughter of Mufti Mohammad Sayeed)
Tassaduq Hussain MuftiFormer member of Jammu and Kashmir Legislative Council (son of Mufti Mohammad Sayeed)

Jharkhand

Soren family 

 Shibu SorenCurrent Member of Parliament, Rajya Sabha and former Chief Minister of Jharkhand
 Hemant SorenCurrent  Chief Minister of Jharkhand (son of Shibu Soren)
 Durga SorenFormer member of Jharkhand Legislative Assembly (son of Shibu Soren)
 Sita SorenCurrent member of Jharkhand Legislative Assembly (wife of Durga Soren)

Karnataka

Devegowda family 

H. D. Devegowda - Former Prime Minister of India, only prime minister from Karnataka , Former Chief Minister of Karnataka and Current Member of Rajya Sabha 
H. D. Kumaraswamy - MLA and former chief Minister of Karnataka.(Son of H. D. Devegowda) 
Anitha Kumaraswamy - Member of Karnataka Legislative Assembly. (Wife of H. D. Kumaraswamy) 
H. D. Revanna - MLA, former Minister of the Karnataka Public Works Department(Son of H. D. Devegowda) 
Prajwal Revanna - Member of the 17th Lok Sabha from Hassan (son of H. D. Revanna)
Suraj Revanna - Member of Legislative Council from Hassan Constituency (Son of H. D. Revanna) 
Bhavani Revanna - Member of Zilla Panchayth Hassan. (Wife of H. D. Revanna)

Kerala

Madhya Pradesh

Singh family (Churhat) 

Rao Shiv Bahadur Singh (1894–1955) from ChurhatMember of Jawaharlal Nehru's cabinet
Arjun Singh - Former Union Minister for Human Resources Department and former Chief Minister of Madhya Pradesh (son of Rao) 
Ajay Arjun SinghFormer cabinet minister in the Madhya Pradesh government and former opposition leader (son of Arjun)

Chaudhary family

 Chaudhary Dilip Singh ChaturvediMLA from Bhind
 Chaudhary Rakesh Singh ChaturvediFormer cabinet minister, former leader of the opposition, MLA from Bhind (son) 
 Chaudhary Mukesh Singh ChaturvediMLA from Mehgaon (son)

Chaturvedi family 

Vidyawati ChaturvediMLA from Laundi
Satyavrat ChaturvediMember of the Rajya Sabha (son)

Nath family 

Kamal NathFormer Chief Minister of Madhya Pradesh, former Minister of Urban Development, former member of the Lok Sabha from Chhindwara
Alka NathFormer MP from Chhindwara (wife)
Nakul NathMember of the Lok Sabha from Chhindwara (son)

MP Singh family 

 Balbhadra SinghMLA from Raghogarh
 Digvijaya Singh15th Chief Minister of Madhya Pradesh (son)
 Lakshman SinghMLA from Raghogarh (son)
 Mool SinghMLA from Raghogarh (nephew)

Vajpayee family 

 Atal Bihari Vajpayee10th Prime Minister of India
 Karuna ShuklaMember of the 14th Lok Sabha (niece)

Maharashtra

Ambedkar family

 B. R. Ambedkar (1891-1956) - Father of the Constitution of India, first Minister of Law and Justice, Member of Parliament, Rajya Sabha, labour member of the Viceroy's Executive Council, opposition leader in the Bombay Legislative Assembly, member of the Bombay Legislative Council
 Yashwant Ambedkar (1912-1977) - Leader of the Republican Party of India, member of the Maharashtra Legislative Council (son of B. R. Ambedkar)
 Prakash Ambedkar - Leader of the Vanchit Bahujan Aghadi, former Lok Sabha and Rajya Sabha MP (son of Yashwant)
 Anandraj Ambedkar - Leader of the Republican Sena (son of Yashwant)

Thackeray family 

Uddhav Thackeray - Former Chief Minister of Maharashtra
Aditya Thackeray - Cabinet minister in the Government of Maharashtra (son)

Pawar family 

Sharad Pawar – Former Defence Minister of India and Chief Minister of Maharashtra
Supriya Sule – Member of the Lok Sabha From Baramati (daughter)
Ajit Pawar – Former Deputy Chief Minister of Maharashtra , Leader of Opposition in the Maharashtra Legislative Assembly (nephew)
Rohit Rajendra Pawar - Member of Maharashtra assembly (nephew's son)

Odisha

Patnaik family
Biju Patnaik - Former Chief Minister of Odisha (earlier known as Orissa)
Naveen Patnaik - Chief Minister of Odisha (son)

Biswal family
Basant Kumar Biswal - Former Deputy Chief Minister of Odisha
Chiranjib Biswal - Former deputy opposition leader of the Odisha Legislative Assembly (son)

Puducherry

Reddiar family 

V. Venkatasubha ReddiarFormer Chief Minister of Pondicherry and freedom fighter
V. Vaithilingam ReddiarFormer Chief Minister of Pondicherry (son)

Farook family 
M. O. H. FarookFormer Chief Minister of Pondicherry
 M. O. H. F. ShahjahanFormer Education Minister of Pondicherry (son)

Punjab

Talwandi family 

 Jagdev Singh Talwandi –  Former President Shiromani Akali Dal; Former President Shiromani Gurdwara Parbandhak Committee; Former MP (Lok Sabha); Former MP (Rajya Sabha); Former MLA
 Ranjit Singh Talwandi – former MLA from Raikot constituency
 Jagjit Singh Talwandi – SGPC member
 Harjit Kaur Talwandi – President women's wing Shiromani Akali Dal(Sanyukt)
 Master Dev Raj Singh – former MLA

Badal family 
Prakash Singh Badal – Former Chief Minister of Punjab 
Sukhbir Singh Badal – Former Deputy Chief Minister of Punjab, MP (Lok Sabha), president Shiromani Akali Dal (Badal) (son)
Harsimrat Kaur Badal – Member of the Lok Sabha (wife of Sukhbir Singh)
Bikram Singh Majithia – Former minister, Punjab (brother of Harsimrat Kaur)
Adesh Pratap Singh Kairon – Minister, Punjab (son-in-law of Prakash Singh)

Brar (Harcharan) family 

 Harcharan Singh Brar – Former Chief Minister of Punjab
 Gurbinder Kaur Brar – Former MP (wife of Harcharan Singh Brar)
 Adesh Kanwarjit Singh Brar – Former MLA (son of Harcharan Singh Brar and Gurbinder Kaur Brar)
 Karan Kaur Brar – Former MLA (wife of Adesh Kanwarjit Singh Brar)

Brar (Jaswinder) family 

Jaswinder Singh Brar – Former Corporate Minister of Punjab
Mantar Singh Brar – MLA and Chief Parliamentary Secretary, Punjab SAD (son)

Singh (Amarinder) family 
Amarinder Singh Former CM Punjab, former Lok Sabha member, member of the Punjab Legislative Assembly
Preneet KaurMember of the Lok Sabha, former member of the Punjab Legislative Assembly (wife)

Sidhu family
Navjot Singh SidhuMember of the Punjab Legislative Assembly, former minister in the Amarinder Singh government, former Lok Sabha and Rajya Sabha member
Navjot Kaur SidhuFormer member of the Punjab Legislative Assembly (wife)

Rajasthan

Bishnoi family 

 Ram Singh Bishnoi - Former Cabinet Minister and 7 times member of Rajasthan Legislative Assembly
 Malkhan Singh Bishnoi - Former member of Rajasthan Legislative Assembly (son of Ram Singh Bishnoi)
 Mahendra Bishnoi - MLA from Luni in Jodhpur district (son of Malkhan Singh Bishnoi)

Gehlot family 

 Ashok Gehlot - Current Chief Minister of Rajasthan
 Vaibhav Gehlot - chairman, Rajasthan Cricket Association (son of Ashok Gehlot)

Maderna family 

 Parasram Maderna - Former cabinet minister Government of Rajasthan and former Speaker of Rajasthan Legislative Assembly
 Mahipal Maderna - Former cabinet minister Government of Rajasthan (son of Parasram Maderna)
 Divya Maderna - Member of Rajasthan Legislative Assembly (daughter of Mahipal Maderna)

Meena family 
Bharat lal meena former cabinet minister in Rajasthan government. 4 time MLA from bamanwas constituency.

 Namo Narain Meena, former minister of state, former union minister of state from congress party
 Harish Meena, former DGP of rajasthan and MP of Dausa constituency from Bjp party
 Om Prakash Meena, chief secretary of Rajasthan

Mirdha family 

 Baldev Ram Mirdha
 Ram Niwas Mirdha - Former central cabinet minister (son of Baldev Ram Mirdha)
 Harendra Mirdha - Former cabinet minister Government of Rajasthan
 Raghuvendra Mirdha - Member Rajasthan Pradesh Congress Committee
 Nathuram Mirdha - Former Member of the Rajasthan Legislative Assembly (nephew of Baldev Ram Mirdha)
 Bhanu Prakash Mirdha - Former MP, Lok Sabha (son of Nathuram Mirdha)
 Richpal Mirdha - Member of Legislative Assembly
 Jyoti Mirdha - Member of Parliament

Pilot family 

 Rajesh Pilot - Former Central cabinet minister
 Rama Pilot - Former Member of Parliament (wife)
 Sachin Pilot - Member of the Rajasthan Legislative Assembly, Former Deputy Chief Minister and Former Union Minister in Government of India. (son of Rajesh Pilot and son-in-law of Farooq Abdullah)

Raje family 

 Vasundhara Raje - Former Chief Minister of Rajasthan
 Dushyant Singh - MP, Lok Sabha (son of Vasundhara Raje)

Sharma family 

 Banwari Lal Sharma - Former Cabinet Minister and 5 time MLA from Dholpur Assembly constituency
 Ashok Sharma - MLA and former Dholpur President of Congress
 Ritesh Sharma - Mayor of Dholpur
 Murari Lal Sharma - Nagar Palika Chairman of Dholpur

Singh family 

 Jaswant Singh - Former Union Minister in Government of India
 Manvendra Singh - MP, Lok Sabha (son of Jaswant Singh)

Verma family 

 Manikya Lal Verma - First Prime Minister of Undivided Rajasthan, Former MP, Lok Sabha from Tonk and Chittorgarh
 Naraini Devi Verma - Former Member of Parliament (wife of Manikya Lal Verma)
 Deen Bandhu Verma - Former Member of Parliament from Udaipur, Former Member of Legislative Assembly from Kapasan, Former Minister of State, Govt of Rajasthan (son of Manikya Lal Verma)

Vishnoi family 

 Poonam Chand Vishnoi - Former Speaker of Rajasthan Legislative Assembly
 Vijay Laxmi Bishnoi - Member of PCC (daughter of Poonam Chand Vishnoi)

Tamil Nadu

Families in  DMK

The Karunanidhi Family - DMK
 M. Karunanidhi, Former Chief Minister of Tamil Nadu
 M. K. Alagiri, Former Minister of Chemicals and Fertilizers of the Republic of India (Second son of Karunanidhi)
 M. K. Stalin, Chief Minister of Tamil Nadu (Third son of Karunanidhi)
 Udhayanidhi Stalin, Minister for Youth Welfare and Sports Development of Tamil Nadu (Grandson of Karunanidhi and Son of Stalin)
 Kanimozhi Karunanidhi, Member of Parliament, Lok Sabha (Second daughter of Karunanidhi)
 Murasoli Maran, Former Minister of Commerce and Industry of the Republic of India (Nephew of Karunanidhi)
Dayanidhi Maran, Former Minister of Textiles of the Republic of India (Son of Murasoli)

The Durai Murugan Family - DMK 
Durai Murugan (Current Minister for Water Resources of Tamil Nadu)
Kathir Anand Member of Parliament from Vellore (Lok Sabha constituency) (Only Son of Durai Murugan)

The P.T.R Family - DMK 
 P. T. Rajan, Chief Minister of Madras Presidency in 1936.
 P. T. R. Palanivel Rajan, former Speaker of the Tamil Nadu Legislative Assembly and Minister in the State Cabinet.
P.T.R.Palanivel Thiyagarajan , finance minister of Tamil Nadu.

The T R Baalu Family - DMK 
T R Baalu, MP from Sriperumbudur and Treasurer of DMK
T R B Rajaa, MLA from Mannargudi , Member of TN State Planning Commission and Secretary of DMK IT Wing

The V. Thangapandian Family - DMK 
  V. ThangapandianFormer MLA Aruppukottai (state assembly constituency) 
Thangam Thennarasu, Son of [V. Thangapandian]. Minister for Department of Industries, Tamil Official Language, Tamil Culture and Archeology Minister of Tamil Nadu]] 
Thamizhachi Thangapandian, Daughter  of [V. Thangapandian]. She is member of Parliament Chennai South (Lok Sabha constituency)

The I. Periyasamy Family - DMK 
I. Periyasamy,  2021 Minister of Co-operation, Government of Tamil Nadu.
I P Senthil Kumar, Son of I.Periyasamy, an MLA from Attur (state assembly constituency)

The Anbil P. Dharmalingam Family - DMK 
Anbil P. Dharmalingam, was one of the founder-members of the  Dravida Munnetra Kazhagam (DMK)
Anbil Poyyamozhi, son of Anbil P. Dharmalingam, Former minister of School Education of Tamil Nadu,
Anbil Mahesh Poyyamozhi, son of  Anbil  Poyyamozhi  a member of Dravida Munnetra Kazhagam, Minister for School Education in Tamil Nadu
Anbil Periyasamy, son of Anbil P. Dharmalingam, Former Member of the Legislative Assembly of Tamil Nadu, Tiruchirappalli – II

The K. Anbazhagan Family - DMK 
K. Anbazhagan, Former minister of Finance.
A.Vetriazhagan, Grandson of K. Anbazhagan, an MLA from Villivakkam (state assembly constituency)

The K. Ponmudy  Family - DMK
K. Ponmudy, Minister of Higher Education of Tamil Nadu
Gautham Sigamani, Son of K.Ponmudy, an MP from Kallakurichi (Lok Sabha constituency)

The Aladi Aruna (alias) V Arunachalam Family - DMK 
Aladi Aruna, Former Minister of Law  
Poongothai Aladi Aruna, Daughter of Aladi Aruna, Former minister of Tamil Nadu for Information Technology

The N. V. Natarajan Family -  DMK 
N. V. Natarajan Founding member of DMK. He was former minister for Labour  and Backward classes in Tamil Nadu Government during 1969 - 1975
N. V. N. Somu Son of N. V. Natarajan. He was former Lok Shaba member. 
Kanimozhi NVN Somu Daughter of N. V. N. Somu Member of Rajya Shaba from DMK.

The Arcot N. Veeraswami Family - DMK 
Arcot N. Veeraswami Former treasurer of DMK, Former Minister of DMK
Kalanidhi Veeraswamy  Member of Lok Shaba from North Chennai constituency

The N. Periasamy Family - DMK
N. Periasamy,former Member of the Legislative Assembly (MLA) from Tuticorin constituency in the 1989[1] and 1996 elections.
Geetha Jeevan  is the daughter of N. Periasamy,Minister for Social Welfare and Women Empowerment

The K. P. P. Samy Family - DMK 
K. P. P. Samy,former Minister for Fisheries in Tamil Nadu state of India
K P Shankar, brother of K. P. P. Samy,member Legislative Assembly from the Tiruvottiyur constituency in 2021

The S. Sivasubramanian Family - DMK
S. Sivasubramanian, Member of the Legislative Assembly of Tamil Nadu from Andimadam constituency in 1989 election
S. S. Sivasankar,Minister for Transport

The Families in Congress

The Rajagopalachari Family - Congress 
Late C. Rajagopalachari, Chief Minister of Madras Presidency (1937–40), Madras State (1952–54), Governor of West Bengal (1946–48), Governor-General of India (1948–50). Union Minister in Government of India (1950–52).
 Gopalkrishna Gandhi, Governor of West Bengal.
 C. R. Narasimhan, Former Member of Lok Sabha from Krishnagiri.

The C.P.Ramaswami Iyer family - Congress
 C. P. Ramaswami Iyer, Member of Madras Legislative Council and Diwan of Travancore.
 C. R. Pattabhi Raman, Former Member of Lok Sabha from Kumbakonam.

The Bhaktavatsalam Family - Congress 
 M. Bhaktavatsalam, Chief Minister of Madras state (1962–1967).
Jayanthi Natarajan, Former Member of Indian Parliament.

The Families in AIADMK

The M. G. Ramachandran Family - AIADMK
 M. G. Ramachandran, Former Chief Minister of Tamil Nadu
 V. N. Janaki Ramachandran, Former Chief Minister of Tamil Nadu (Wife of Ramachandran)

The O. Panneerselvam Family - AIADMK 
 O. Panneerselvam, Former Chief Minister of Tamil Nadu
 P. Ravindhranath, Member of Parliament, Lok Sabha (First son of Panneerselvam)

Families in multiparties

The Kumaramangalam Family - Multiparty
Late P. Subbarayan,  former Chief Minister of Madras Presidency (1926–1930), Member of Lok Sabha from Tiruchengode
 Radhabai Subbarayan, Famous human rights activist
 Mohan Kumaramangalam, politician and trade union leader from the Communist Party of India.
 Rangarajan Kumaramangalam, Indian politician. Member of Lok Sabha from Salem and later, Tiruchirapalli and Union Minister in Government of India
 Lalitha Kumaramangalam, politician and member of the BJP's national executive.
 Parvathi Krishnan , Former Member of Lok Sabha from Coimbatore.

The V. K. Sasikala Family - Multi Parties
VK Sasikala, Indian Businesswoman turned Politician 
 M. Natarajan, Sasikala's husband                              
 V. K. Dhivakaran, Founding General Secretary Of Anna Dravidar Kazhagam and brother of VK Sasikala               
 T. T. V. Dhinakaran,  General Secretary Of Ammk and Sasikala's elder Sister Vanimani's Son                   
 Anuradha Dhinakaran , Dhinakaran's wife.                   
 V. N. Sudhakaran, Jayalalithaa's foster son and brother of TTV Dhinakaran                          
 T. T. V. Bhaskaran, Founding General Secretary Of Anna Mgr Makkal Munnetra Kazhagam and brother of TTV Dhinakaran                           
 J. Illavarsi, Sasikala's brother Jayaraman's widow                        
 Vivek Jayaraman, Sasikala's brother Jayaraman's son

Family in MDMK

The Vaiko Family - MDMK
 Vaiko, founder of the Marumalarchi Dravida Munnetra Kazhagam.
 Durai Vaiyapuri, Internet wing MDMK.

Family in PMK

The Ramadoss Family - PMK
S. Ramadoss PMK founder
Anbumani Ramadoss Member of Parliament from Rajya Sabha and former Cabinet Minister (Ministry of Health) during 2004-09

Family in TMC

The G. K. Moopanar Family - TMC 
Late G. K. Moopanar, Indian politician and founder of the Tamil Maanila Congress.
 G. K. Vasan, Former Union Minister in Government of India.

Tripura

Singh family 
 Sachindra Lal Singh - Former chief minister of Tripura 
 Asish Lal Singh - State president of Trinamool Congress (son)

Uttar Pradesh

Chaudhary Family 
  Chaudhary Charan Singh, ex-Prime Minister of India
Chaudhary Ajit Singh, founder of Rashtriya Lok Dal
Jayant Chaudhary, Member of Parliament Rajya Sabha

Gorakhnath Math family 
 Digvijay Nath, former state president of Hindu Mahasabha and MP.
 Mahant Avaidyanath, adopted son of Digvijay Nath, MP & MLA, later joined the Bhartiya Janta Party
 Yogi Adityanath, adopted son of Mahant Avaidyanath, MP & MLA, Chief Minister of Uttar Pradesh

Yadav family 
Mulayam Singh Yadav – former Chief Minister of Uttar Pradesh, former Defence Minister of India
Akhilesh Yadav – Former chief minister of Uttar Pradesh (son of Mulayam)
Dimple Yadav – Former Lok Sabha MP (daughter-in-Law of Mulayam)
Abhay Ram Yadav (brother)
Dharmendra Yadav – Former Lok Sabha MP (nephew of Mulayam)
Shivpal Singh Yadav –  Former Minister in the  government of Uttar Pradesh (brother)
Rajpal Singh Yadav (brother)
Abhishek Yadav alias Anshul Yadav - District Panchayat Chairman of Etawah (nephew of Mulayam)
Ram Gopal Yadav – MP Rajya Sabha (cousin brother)
Akshay Yadav – Former Lok Sabha MP (son of Ram Gopal)

Khan family 
 Azam Khan (born 1948), former Leader of the Opposition Uttar Pradesh Legislative Assembly; former Cabinet Minister in the Government of Uttar Pradesh; former MP Lok Sabha and Rajya Sabha; ten-term MLA Rampur constituency
 Tazeen Fatma, former Member of parliament, Rajya Sabha; former MLA Rampur constituency
 Abdullah Azam Khan, twice elected MLA for the Suar Assembly constituency

West Bengal

Subhas Chandra Bose family 

 Subhas Chandra BoseIndian nationalist
 Sharat Chandra Bose
Subrata Bose - Member of parliament (MP) from Barasat Lok Sabha constituency 2004-2009 (youngest son of Sarat Chandra Bose and nephew of Subhas Chandra Bose)
Sisir Kumar Bose - Indian freedom fighter, pediatrician and legislator (nephew of Subhas Chandra and husband of Krishna Bose) 
Krishna Bose - MP from Jadavpur 1996-2004 (wife of Sisir Kumar Bose, Subhas Chandra Bose's nephew) 
Sugata Bose - Lok Sabha MP from Jadavpur 2014-2019 (Sisir Kumar Bose and Krishna Bose's son)

Dasmunsi family 

Priya Ranjan Dasmunsi - Former cabinet minister in the government of India
Deepa Dasmunsi - Former Minister of State for Urban Development in the government of India (wife)

Konar family 

Hare Krishna Konar, freedom fighter and politician, one of the founding member of Communist Consolidation and later one of the co-founder of Communist Party of India (Marxist), first Minister of Land and Land Reforms
Benoy Krishna Konar, Former MLA and president of All India Kisan Sabha, younger brother of Hare Krishna Konar

Banerjee family 

 Mamata Banerjee - Chief Minister of West Bengal
Abhishek Banerjee - MP from Diamond Harbour constituency (nephew)

Bandopadhyay family 

 Sudip Bandyopadhyay - MP from the Kolkata Uttar constituency

Ahmed family 

 Sultan Ahmed - MP and former Union Minister of State for Tourism Department, government of India
 Sajda Ahmed - MP from the Uluberia constituency (wife)
 Iqbal Ahmed - MLA and former deputy mayor of Kolkata (brother)

Chatterjee family 

 Nirmal Chandra Chatterjee - MP from Hoogly 
 Somnath Chatterjee - Speaker of the Lok Sabha and MP from Bolpur (son)

References 

 
 
India politics-related lists
Lists of Indian families
Lists of political families